SM St Joseph Papar is a Malaysian secondary school in Papar, Malaysia. It was established in 1953.

History

References

Papar District
Secondary schools in Malaysia
Schools in Sabah